Hylurgopinus rufipes, known as the native elm bark beetle, is a species of elm bark beetles in the tribe Hylesinini (crenulate bark beetles). It is found in Canada and the United States. It is of particular importance as a vector of Dutch elm disease. It is brownish-red in color and its size ranges from 2.34 mm to 2.9 mm.

References 

Beetles of North America
Scolytinae